The 1995 Memphis Tigers football team represented the University of Memphis as an independent during the 1995 NCAA Division I-A football season. Led by first-year head coach Rip Scherer, the Tigers compiled a record of 3–8. Memphis played home games at the  Liberty Bowl Memorial Stadium in Memphis, Tennessee.

Schedule

References

Memphis
Memphis Tigers football seasons
Memphis Tigers football